White Cloud is an unincorporated community in Hickory County, in the U.S. state of Missouri.  It is north-northwest of Hermitage, Missouri, the county seat.

The community most likely was named after Chief Mahaska (1784–1843), or Mewhushekaw, also known as White Cloud.

References

Unincorporated communities in Hickory County, Missouri
Unincorporated communities in Missouri